The Klonowskie Range is a range in Poland stretching from the valley Zagnańska Bobrza in the west, to the east around Bodzentyn within the Świętokrzyskie Mountains. It is constructed mainly of Devonian sandstone and quartzite and is almost entirely covered with fir and beech forest.

The main peaks 
 Barcza - 465 m above sea-level
 Czosnek - 429 m
 Bukowa Góra - 484 m
 Psarska Gora - 415 m
 Miejska Góra - 426 m
 Góra Chełm - 399 m

References

Mountain ranges of Poland